Jerry Sokoloski (born May 6, 1983, Winnipeg) is a Canadian actor and one of the tallest people in Canada. In November 2007, The Guinness Book of World Records measured him at 7 feet and 4 1/2 inches and in 2008, they certified him as the tallest man in Canada and is Managed by M Models and Talent Agency He has since been surpassed by Sim Bhullar who measures 7'5" tall. Sokoloski was measured whilst wearing sneakers with a heel height of 2" on the Canadian morning show Breakfast Television at 7'4".

Basketball
Sokoloski played high school basketball in Canada for Silverthorn Collegiate Institute before transferring to Chinguacousy High School and Father Henry Carr Catholic Secondary School. He missed his senior season due to eligibility issues after transferring schools. He did not play college basketball but declared himself eligible for the NBA draft in 2004 and had workouts with a number of NBA teams but was not drafted.

References

External links
Jerry Sokoloski at realgm.com

1983 births
Living people
Basketball people from Ontario
Canadian people of Polish descent
Centers (basketball)